Çakırlar can refer to:

 Çakırlar, Kemah
 Çakırlar, Kargı
 Çakırlar, Tufanbeyli
 Çakırlar, Yapraklı